The Body Art Collection are a selection of limited edition electric guitars made by the guitar manufacturer B.C. Rich. The series is based on the company's 'platinum series' and was made over two years from January 2003 until December 2004. The classic B.C. Rich shapes were given a new look with various images. Each guitar in the series carries a unique serial number and a 'limited edition' plaque on the reverse of the guitar, incorporated into the bolt-on neck.

Guitars in the Series

2003

There are also 5 additional models in the Body Art series, which were not specifically attributed to any month in 2004:

This particular Body Art was unique as it is the only one not done "in house".
The artwork was provided by well-known artist and sword designer Kit Rae.

B.C. Rich electric guitars